Joe Etzel Field is a 1,300 seat baseball stadium in Portland, Oregon that is home to the University of Portland Pilots baseball team. Originally named Pilot Field, it was renamed after former coach Joe Etzel in 2004.

Completed in 2005, the Andy Pienovi Hitting Facility is the baseball team's practice facility. It is located in foul territory in left field.

Preliminary campus expansion plans include moving the baseball field from its current location to one down on the waterfront in the Triangle Park property. Those plans were abandoned in 2013 with plans to instead renovate the existing stadium. The school has since added artificial turf and lighting.

The first game played on this field was on February 23, 1988 vs. George Fox University in a 15-1 win.

See also
 List of NCAA Division I baseball venues
 List of sports venues in Portland, Oregon
 West Coast Conference

References

External links
 Joe Etzel Field Facilities Page
https://portlandpilots.com/sports/2008/8/11/BSB_0811081030.aspx?tab=joeetzelfield

Portland Pilots baseball
College baseball venues in the United States
Sports venues in Portland, Oregon
Baseball venues in Oregon
1988 establishments in Oregon
Sports venues completed in 1988
Baseball in Portland, Oregon